Oreocarya (Perennial Cat's-Eye) is a genus of flowering plants in the family Boraginaceae. There are about 63 species and its native range extends from western and central Canada, through western United States to north Mexico. It is part of subtribe of Amsinckiinae.

It was once thought to be a either a subgenus or synonym of Cryptantha , as they both had plenty of tiny flowers, hairy leaves, and persisting dried flower stems.

Botanist William Alfred Weber later noted that the 2 genera were different in form as Oreocarya was a "biennial or perennial from rosettes of basal leaves; flowers more than 5 mm in diameter, often distinctly long-tubular with prominent yellow eye", while Cryptantha was an "annual without rosettes of basal leaves; flowers minute, less than 5 mm diameter, short-tubed with inconspicuous eye".

Description
They are perennial or biennial, plants. Most species are perennials but a few (such as O. setosissima and O. virgata) are biennial.
Species of Oreocarya have a taproot, with branching and a simple or branching caudex, which has a rosette of leaves at the top. From this the flowering stem rises. The herbaceous stem is various among the species, but generally the stems are foliate or bracteate, with branches bearing several helicoid cymes (as flowers). Most species have linear, spatulate (spoon shaped) or oblanceolate shaped leaves, with entire margins and a (leaf) blade that is gradually narrowed to a long, slender petiole. The flower (or inflorescence) is an open, rounded, leafy bracteate thyrsus or a helicoid shaped cyme.

Taxonomy
The Latin specific epithet Oreocarya is derived from "Oreos" which is Greek for "mountain" and "caryum" is Greek for "nut".

It was first published by Edward Lee Greene in Pittonia vol.1 on page 57 in 1887.

In 1887, several species found in the genus Eritrichium were segregated out by Greene. Genus Allocarya was formed, then the genera Piptocalyx, Eremocarya and Oreocarya were formed. Oreocarya had nine former species from the genus Eritrichium. 
In 1896, Greene described 8 more species (of Oreocarya) and in 1899 he added 2 more species and then in 1901, he added another 2 species of Oreocarya to the genus.
Other botanical authors (including Alice Eastwood and Per Axel Rydberg, added more species to the genus up until 1916.
In 1916, Macbride carried out a revision of the genus (which had 45 species by then). Then in 1924, Ivan M. Johnston wrote that the genus of Oreocarya could be combined with Cryptantha. Payson in 1927 (A Monograph of the section Oreocarya of Cryptantha, Ann. Mo. Bot. Gard. 14:211-358) agreed with Johnston and all the species of Oreocarya became Cryptantha species. More species were found up until 1969 and also placed in the Cryptantha genus.

In 2012, the phylogenetic relationship of members of the genus Cryptantha was carried out, based on dna sequencing analyses, it was then
proposed that the resurrection of the following genera Eremocarya, Greeneocharis, Johnstonella, and also Oreocarya. Weber and Wittman (2012) then placed all perennial species of Cryptantha back in the genus Oreocarya. Botanist John Kartesz from Missouri Botanical Garden Press agreed with the re-classification, as part of the Biota of North America Program (BONAP) in 2015.

Distribution
It is found in Canada (within the provinces of Alberta, British Columbia and Saskatchewan) in the United States (within the states of Alaska, Arizona, California, Colorado, Idaho, Kansas, Montana, Nebraska, Nevada, New Mexico, North Dakota, Oklahoma, Oregon, South Dakota, Texas, Utah, Washington and Wyoming) and also in northern Mexico. Most species are found in the Colorado Plateau and the Great Basin of the U.S.

Ecology
Most species grow in xerophytic habitats at middle elevations. Only a few species can tolerate growing in the shade of overhanging trees or shrubs. 
Some species grow in sandy deserts (O. jamesii), on alpine slopes (such as O. weberi, O. crymophile and O. thompsonii), O. virginensis, O. rugulosa and O. semiglabra can tolerate clay soils, but no species grows in moist and undrained soils.

Known species
There are 63 accepted species listed by Kew, and the Biota of North America Program.

Oreocarya abortiva 
Oreocarya aperta 
Oreocarya atwoodii 
Oreocarya bakeri 
Oreocarya barnebyi 
Oreocarya breviflora 
Oreocarya caespitosa 
Oreocarya cana 
Oreocarya capitata 
Oreocarya compacta 
Oreocarya confertiflora 
Oreocarya crassipes 
Oreocarya creutzfeldtii 
Oreocarya crymophila 
Oreocarya elata 
Oreocarya flava 
Oreocarya flavoculata 
Oreocarya fulvocanescens 
Oreocarya glomerata 
Oreocarya grahamii 
Oreocarya hoffmannii 
Oreocarya humilis 
Oreocarya hypsophila 
Oreocarya insolita 
Oreocarya interrupta 
Oreocarya johnstonii 
Oreocarya jonesiana 
Oreocarya leucophaea 
Oreocarya longiflora 
Oreocarya mensana 
Oreocarya nubigena 
Oreocarya oblata 
Oreocarya ochroleuca 
Oreocarya osterhoutii 
Oreocarya palmeri 
Oreocarya paradoxa 
Oreocarya paysonii 
Oreocarya propria 
Oreocarya revealii 
Oreocarya rollinsii 
Oreocarya roosiorum 
Oreocarya rugulosa 
Oreocarya salmonensis 
Oreocarya schoolcraftii 
Oreocarya semiglabra 
Oreocarya sericea 
Oreocarya setosissima 
Oreocarya shackletteana 
Oreocarya sobolifera 
Oreocarya spiculifera 
Oreocarya stricta 
Oreocarya subcapitata 
Oreocarya subretusa 
Oreocarya suffruticosa 
Oreocarya tenuis 
Oreocarya thompsonii 
Oreocarya thyrsiflora 
Oreocarya tumulosa 
Oreocarya virgata 
Oreocarya virginensis 
Oreocarya weberi 
Oreocarya welshii 
Oreocarya wetherillii

References

Other sources
 Cronquist, A. et al. 1972-. Intermountain flora.
 Johnston, I. M. 1927. Studies in the Boraginaceae VI. A revision of the South American Boraginoideae. Contr. Gray Herb. 78:31.

Boraginoideae
Boraginaceae genera
Plants described in 1887
Flora of Alaska
Flora of Western Canada
Flora of the Northwestern United States
Flora of the Southwestern United States
Flora of the South-Central United States
Flora of Northeastern Mexico
Flora of Northwestern Mexico